Voodoo Dawn is a 1991 American horror film directed by Steven Fierberg and starring Tony Todd, Raymond St. Jacques, Theresa Merritt and Gina Gershon. It was written by Jeffrey Delman, Evan Dunsky, Thomas Rendon and John A. Russo, and produced by Steven D. Mackler.

The film was adapted from the eponymous pulp horror novel by John A. Russo, known also as the screenwriter for Night of the Living Dead.

Premise
In the Deep South, a diabolical, machete-wielding voodoo priest (Tony Todd) is busily turning Haitian migrant farm workers into flesh-eating, zombie slaves. However, his plans are disrupted by the arrival of two college students searching for a missing colleague who turns out to have been one of the priest's earlier zombie experiments.

Cast
 Tony Todd as Makoute
 Raymond St. Jacques as Claude
 Theresa Merritt as Madame Daslay
 Gina Gershon as Tina
 J. Grant Albrecht as Tony
 Kirk Baily as Kevin
 Billy 'Sly' Williams as Miles
 Georgia Allen as Suzanne
 Gloria Reuben as Girl on Boat

Production
Voodoo Dawn was shot in South Carolina.

Reception
Variety called it "an atmospheric supernatural thriller for genre fans".  Nigel Honeybone of HorrorNews.Net wrote that it should be watched by horror fans based on the novelty value of having been written by Russo. Peter Dendle wrote in The Zombie Movie Encyclopedia, "Though acting and production value are solid, the script is outdated by about forty years and assumes we want to see more witch doctor than zombie."

References

External links
 
 
 

1991 films
1990s supernatural horror films
1990s English-language films
Fiction about Haitian Vodou
American supernatural horror films
American zombie films
Films about Voodoo
Films shot in South Carolina
Films based on American horror novels
1991 directorial debut films
1990s American films